Diarmuid Murphy (1895–1966) was an Irish writer, theatre and film producer.

Murphy was known as a short story writer, and Professor of English at University College, Galway. He was chairman of An Taibhdhearc na Gaillimhe up to his death.

Bibliography

 Hewn of the Rock, Dublin and Cork, Talbot Press, 1934.

See also
 Richard Murphy, born 1927
 Tom Murphy, born 1935

References
 Galway Authors, Helen Maher, 1976

External links
 http://www.antaibhdhearc.com/

1895 births
1966 deaths
Academics of the University of Galway
Irish male short story writers
20th-century Irish short story writers
People from County Galway
20th-century Irish male writers